Robert Caesar (9 October 1602 – 27 October 1637) was an English lawyer and politician who sat in the House of Commons in 1625 and 1626.

Caesar was the son of Sir Julius Caesar, privy councillor of James I and Charles I. He attended Eton from 1609 to 1615. He matriculated at Queen's College, Oxford on 26 January 1616, aged 13 and was awarded BA on 15 October 1618. He was called to the bar at Inner Temple in 1622.

In 1625, he was elected Member of Parliament for Bodmin. He was elected MP for Ilchester in 1626. From 1628 to 1636 he was a Clerk of the Petty Bag and from 1636 to 1637 one of the Six Clerks in the Court of Chancery . 
 
On 7 December 1630 in Rolls Chapel he married Elizabeth, daughter of John Manning, a merchant of London.
 
Caesar died at the age of 35.

References

1602 births
1637 deaths
People educated at Eton College
Members of the pre-1707 English Parliament for constituencies in Cornwall
Alumni of The Queen's College, Oxford
Members of the Inner Temple
English MPs 1625
English MPs 1626
17th-century English lawyers
English people of Italian descent
Robert
English barristers